Kenneth E. Bailey (November 24, 1930 – May 23, 2016) was an American author, professor of theology, and linguist.

Life
Bailey was born in Bloomington, Illinois. He spent 40 years (1955–1995) teaching in Egypt, Lebanon, Palestine, Israel and Cyprus. He had a degree in Arabic and literature, systematic theology and wrote his dissertation in the field of New Testament. He was ordained by the Presbyterian Church (USA). Since 1962 he taught for the Near East School of Theology in Beirut (since 1974 as professor for New Testament studies), where he founded the Institute for Middle Eastern New Testament Studies. From 1985 to 1995, he taught at the Ecumenical Institute for Theological Research in Jerusalem. He taught at Princeton University and was associate professor of theology in Dubuque, McCormick and Pittsburgh as well as the Fuller Theological Seminary in Los Angeles.

In 1990, Bailey moved to Nicosia, Cyprus and became Canon Theologian of the Anglican Episcopal Diocese of Cyprus and the Gulf. In June 1997, he became Canon Theologian of the Episcopal Diocese of Pittsburgh of the Episcopal Church (United States). Bailey resided in New Wilmington, Pennsylvania.

Bailey died on May 23, 2016, at the age of 85.

Works 
The Good Shepherd, InterVarsity Press, 2014. .
Open Hearts in Bethlehem: A Christmas Drama (Open Hearts in Bethlehem Set), InterVarsity Press, 2013. .
Paul Through Mediterranean Eyes, InterVarsity Press, 2011. .
Jesus Through Middle Eastern Eyes, InterVarsity Press, 2008. .
The Cross and the Prodigal: The 15th Chapter of Luke seen through the eyes of Middle Eastern peasants, Second Edition, InterVarsity, 2005. .
Open Hearts in Bethlehem (A Christmas Musical), Westminster John Knox Press, 2005. .
God Is … Dialogues on the Nature of God, Guardian, 2005. .
Jacob and the Prodigal: How Jesus Retold Israel’s Story, InterVarsity, 2003. 
Finding the Lost: Cultural Keys to Luke 15, Concordia, 1992. .
Poet and Peasant and Through Peasant Eyes, Eerdmans, 1983. .
Through Peasant Eyes: More Lucan parables, their culture and style., Eerdmans, 1980. .
Poet and Peasant: A Literary-Cultural Approach to the Parables of Luke, Eerdmans, 1976. .
God is: Dialogues on the nature of God for young people, Mandate Press, 1976. .
The Cross and the Prodigal: The 15th Chapter of Luke seen through the eyes of Middle Eastern peasants, Concordia, 1973. .

References 

1930 births
2016 deaths
Writers from Bloomington, Illinois
21st-century American male writers
20th-century American male writers
McCormick Theological Seminary
Princeton University faculty
University of Pittsburgh faculty
Fuller Theological Seminary faculty
People from Lawrence County, Pennsylvania
20th-century American Episcopalians